There's Nothing Wrong with Love is the second full-length album released by American indie rock band Built to Spill. There's Nothing Wrong with Love was recorded in May and June 1994, and released September 13, 1994, on the Up Records label.  It was produced by Phil Ek. The songs "Car" and "Distopian Dream Girl" were released as singles. The video for "In the Morning" was featured on Beavis and Butt-head. Pitchfork ranked There's Nothing Wrong with Love No. 24 on its Top 100 Albums of the 90s list. An unlisted final track is a satirical preview of the next Built to Spill album; none of the clips on the track are real Built to Spill songs. Sub Pop reissued the album on vinyl in 2015. This is the only album to feature drummer Andy Capps and the first to feature bassist Brett Nelson.

Track listing
All songs written by Built to Spill except where noted.
 "In the Morning" – 2:37
 "Reasons" – 3:46
 "Big Dipper" – 4:09
 "Car" – 2:59
 "Fling" – 2:33
 "Cleo" (Karena Youtz, Doug Martsch) – 4:35
 "The Source" – 3:20
 "Twin Falls" – 1:49
 "Some" – 5:57
 "Distopian Dream Girl" (Martsch, Brett Nelson, Andy Capps, James Christensen) – 4:24
 "Israel's Song" (Youtz, Martsch, Nelson, Capps) – 3:47
 "Stab" – 5:29
 "Preview" (unlisted track) – 1:23

Personnel
Built to Spill

 Doug Martsch – lead vocals, guitar
Brett Nelson – bass
Andy Capps – drums
Additional musicians
Wayne Rhino Flower – guitar on "Big Dipper" and bass guitar on "Cleo"
John McMahon – cello on "Fling" and "Stab"
Gretchen Yanover – cello on "Car"
Eric Akre – percussion on "Source" and "Twin Falls"
Chad Shaver – guitar on "Midnite Star" (one of the songs in the unlisted preview track)
Phil Ek – speaking voice on "Preview"
Luke W. Midkiff – piano and keyboards

References

Built to Spill albums
1994 albums
Albums produced by Phil Ek
Up Records albums